The 2021 season was the Atlanta Falcons' 56th season in the National Football League, their fifth playing their home games at Mercedes-Benz Stadium and their first under general manager Terry Fontenot and head coach Arthur Smith.

For the first time since 2010, wide receiver Julio Jones was not on the roster as he was traded to the Tennessee Titans on June 6, 2021. Jones departed Atlanta holding the most career receiving yards and receptions in Falcons franchise history.

Following their Week 12 win over the Jacksonville Jaguars, the Falcons improved their 4–12 season from the previous year. However, the Falcons were eliminated from playoff contention for the fourth consecutive year following a Week 17 loss to the Buffalo Bills.

It was also their final season with quarterback Matt Ryan, as he was traded to the Indianapolis Colts for the following season.

Draft

Notes
 The Falcons were awarded 3 compensatory picks in the 2021 NFL Draft.
 The Falcons traded their second-round (35th overall) and sixth-round (219th overall) picks to the Denver Broncos in exchange for their second-round (40th overall) and fourth-round (114th overall) selections.

Staff

Final roster

Preseason

Regular season

Schedule
The Falcons 2021 schedule was announced on May 12. They opened the season at home against the Philadelphia Eagles.

Note: Intra-division opponents are in bold text.

Game summaries

Week 1: vs. Philadelphia Eagles
The Falcons start their season off with a 26-point loss to the Philadelphia Eagles.

Week 2: at Tampa Bay Buccaneers

Week 3: at New York Giants

Week 4: vs. Washington Football Team

Week 5: vs. New York Jets
NFL London games

Week 7: at Miami Dolphins

Week 8: vs. Carolina Panthers

Week 9: at New Orleans Saints

Younghoe Koo kicked a game-winning field goal as time ran out, improving Atlanta to 4–4.

Week 10: at Dallas Cowboys

Week 11: vs. New England Patriots

Week 12: at Jacksonville Jaguars

Week 13: vs. Tampa Bay Buccaneers

Week 14: at Carolina Panthers

Week 15: at San Francisco 49ers

Week 16: vs. Detroit Lions

Week 17: at Buffalo Bills

Week 18: vs. New Orleans Saints

Coming off with a 2-point win in Week 9, they host the Saints. They were defeated by 10 points and finish their season with a 7-10 record.

Standings

Division

Conference

References

External links
 

Atlanta
Atlanta Falcons seasons
Atlanta Falcons